The greenfinches make up the bird genus Chloris.

Greenfinch may also refer to:

 Greenfinches, female personnel of the Ulster Defence Regiment
 , a British coaster in service 1946–1966